Kuzmino is a rural locality (a village) in Gorod Vyazniki, Vyaznikovsky District, Vladimir Oblast, Russia. The population was 3 as of 2010.

Geography 
Kuzmino is located on the Shumar River, 20 km southeast of Vyazniki (the district's administrative centre) by road. Smenki is the nearest rural locality.

References 

Rural localities in Vyaznikovsky District